Emir is a type of white grape native to the Cappadocia region of Turkey. It is mostly grown in the Cappadocia and Nevşehir provinces. 

Emir can be used to make several different kinds of wine. One type is a straw yellow colour with green reflections.

Sparkling wines can also be made from Emir, which have a light yellow colour and high acidity. 

Wines made from Emir don't match with oak barrels and generally should be consumed in 1 – 2 years.

References

Grape varieties of Turkey
White wine grape varieties